Frank Driscoll (born 30 July 1934) is a former Australian rules footballer who played with Essendon in the Victorian Football League (VFL). He later returned to one of his old teams, Navarre, and was captain-coach of Moonambel.

Notes

External links 
		

Essendon Football Club past player profile

1934 births
Living people
Australian rules footballers from Victoria (Australia)
Essendon Football Club players